Heliura cosmosomodes is a moth of the subfamily Arctiinae. It was described by Paul Dognin in 1916. It is found in Brazil.

References

 Natural History Museum Lepidoptera generic names catalog

Arctiinae
Moths described in 1916